Marco Antonio Coccini (1587–1652) was a Roman Catholic prelate who served as Bishop of Imola (1646–1652) and Bishop of Anglona-Tursi (1638–1646).

Biography
Marco Antonio Coccini was born in Rome, Italy in 1587.
On 15 Jan 1638, he was appointed during the papacy of Pope Urban VIII as Bishop of Anglona-Tursi.
On 24 Jan 1638, he was consecrated bishop by Marcello Lante della Rovere, Cardinal-Bishop of Frascati, with Giovanni Battista Altieri (seniore), Bishop Emeritus of Camerino, serving as co-consecrator. 
On 19 Feb 1646, he was appointed during the papacy of Pope Innocent X as Bishop of Imola.
He served as Bishop of Imola until his death in 1652.

Episcopal succession
While bishop, he was the principal co-consecrator of:
Jacobus Philippus Tomasini, Bishop of Novigrad (1642);
Papirio Silvestri, Bishop of Macerata e Tolentino (1642); and 
Jacques Lebret, Bishop of Toul (1645).

References

External links and additional sources
 (for Chronology of Bishops) 
 (for Chronology of Bishops) 
 (for Chronology of Bishops) 
 (for Chronology of Bishops) 

17th-century Italian Roman Catholic bishops
Bishops appointed by Pope Urban VIII
Bishops appointed by Pope Innocent X
1587 births
1652 deaths